David Wagner defeated the two-time defending champion Peter Norfolk in the final, 6–0, 2–6, 6–3 to win the quad singles wheelchair tennis title at the 2010 US Open.

Draw

Final

Round robin
Standings are determined by: 1. number of wins; 2. number of matches; 3. in two-players-ties, head-to-head records; 4. in three-players-ties, percentage of sets won, or of games won; 5. steering-committee decision.

References 
 Singles Draw

Wheelchair Quad Singles
U.S. Open, 2010 Quad Singles